Potato Potahto is a 2017 Ghanaian-Nigerian romantic comedy film which tells a story of divorce in West African society and how tricky it is.

Plot
Potato Potahto is a Ghanaian-Nigerian comedy movie which follows the life of two partners who are forced to live their lives together in the same house after a divorce.

Production
The film is a co-production by Nigerian companies Ascend Studios, 19 April Entertainment Virgo Sun Ltd and Lufodo Productions and was directed by Ghanaian film maker, Shirley Frimpong-Manso. It chronicles the chaotic events which take place when a divorced couple stay on together in the matrimonial home, each taking on young attractive help of the opposite sex. The movie was shot within a span of two weeks, with collaborative efforts from Swedish, French, British, Nigerian and Ghanaian film producers.

Cast
Joselyn Dumas
Chris Attoh
Adjetey Anang
Nikki Samonas
Victoria Michaels
Blossom Chukwujekwu
Kemi Lala Akindoju
Joke Silva
OC Ukeje

Reception 
Potato Potahto was well received by the public, owing to the success Shirley Frimpong-Manso's earlier successes. The movie was rated 7.9 by users on Nollywood Reinvented.  Potato Potahto has seen showings at the Cannes Film Festival, Durban International Film Festival and the British Urban Film Festival. The film also featured as a part of the selections for the Film Africa Festival from October 27 to November 5. In December 2019, Potato Potahto was added officially to Netflix's catalog of movies.

Accolades

References 

2017 films
Ghanaian comedy films
Nigerian comedy films
Films directed by Shirley Frimpong-Manso
2010s English-language films
English-language Ghanaian films
English-language Nigerian films